Events from the year 1951 in Scotland.

Incumbents 

 Secretary of State for Scotland and Keeper of the Great Seal – Hector McNeil until 26 October; then James Stuart

Law officers 
 Lord Advocate – John Thomas Wheatley until November; then James Latham Clyde
 Solicitor General for Scotland – Douglas Johnston until November; then William Rankine Milligan

Judiciary 
 Lord President of the Court of Session and Lord Justice General – Lord Cooper
 Lord Justice Clerk – Lord Thomson
 Chairman of the Scottish Land Court – Lord Gibson

Events 
 11 April – The Stone of Scone is located in Arbroath Abbey having been stolen by Scottish nationalists.
 12 May – Remains of Gunnister Man found in a peat bog in Shetland.
 18–26 May – Festival of Britain: Festival Ship Campania on view in Dundee (King George V Dock).
 25 May–8 September – Festival of Britain: Living Traditions exhibition presented at the Royal Scottish Museum, Edinburgh, by the Council of Industrial Design.
 28 May–18 August – Festival of Britain: Exhibition of Industrial Power in Glasgow (opened by The Princess Elizabeth).
 18 September–6 October – Festival of Britain: Festival Ship Campania on view in Glasgow (Springfield Dock).
 26 October – 1951 United Kingdom general election: The Conservative Party and allies narrowly defeat Labour in Scotland and across the UK; this is the last election in which the Conservatives do better in Scotland than in England.
 30 October – James Stuart is appointed Secretary of State for Scotland; he will hold office until January 1957.
 November – Ecurie Ecosse motor racing team founded by Edinburgh businessman and racing driver David Murray and mechanic Wilkie Wilkinson.
 7 November – first floodlit Association football match in Scotland, a Stenhousemuir v. Hibernian F.C. friendly at the former's Ochilview Park.
 24 November – Beinn Eighe becomes Britain's first national nature reserve.
 Publication of The Third Statistical Account of Scotland commences with the volume for Ayrshire.

Births 
 2 February – Ken Bruce, radio broadcaster
 7 February – Eddie Kelly, footballer
 20 February – Gordon Brown, Labour politician and Prime Minister of the United Kingdom 2007–10
 4 March – Kenny Dalglish, international footballer and manager
 25 April – Ian McCartney, Labour politician
 9 August – James Naughtie, print and radio journalist
 22 August – Alex Neil, Scottish National Party MSP and government minister
 23 September – Andrew Greig, author
 26 September – Stuart Tosh, born Stuart MacIntosh, rock musician
 28 September – Jim Diamond, singer-songwriter (died 2015)
 17 November – Jack Vettriano, born Jack Hoggan, painter
 19 November – Charles Falconer, Baron Falconer of Thoroton, Labour politician and Lord Chancellor
 15 December – Joe Jordan, international footballer and manager
 20 December – Peter May, fiction writer
 22 December – Jim McColl, entrepreneur
 Michael Scott Rohan, fantasy writer

Deaths 
 3 January – Peter McBride, footballer (born 1877)
 29 January – James Bridie (O. H. Mavor), playwright (born 1888)
 3 May – Sir Thomas Henderson, Liberal politician (born 1874) 
 16 May – James Greenlees, rugby union footballer, educationalist and soldier (born 1878)
 9 September – Andrew Blain Baird, engineer and aviation pioneer (born 1862)
 1 October – Peter McWilliam, international footballer and manager (born 1879)
 11 October – Donald Cameron, 25th Lochiel, chief of Clan Cameron (born 1876)

The arts
 19 May – Pitlochry Festival Theatre opens in a tent with the British première of Maxwell Anderson’s Mary of Scotland.
 School of Scottish Studies founded.

See also 
 1951 in Northern Ireland

References 

 
Scotland
Years of the 20th century in Scotland
1950s in Scotland